Priestdale is a suburb in the City of Logan, Queensland, Australia.

Geography 
Priestdale is bounded to the north-west by Priest Gully (a creek), to the north by Priestdale Road, and to the east by Ford Road.

The suburb is relatively undeveloped with rural residential blocks in the north and north-east. The south and west are undeveloped.

Part of the Daisy Hill Conservation Park extends into the centre of the suburb. The park is a significant habitat for koalas.

History
The creek Priest's Gully was named during surveys in the early 1860s but the origin of the name is unclear.

On 31 March 1979, the area was officially named and bounded as a locality by the Queensland Place Names Board. It was redesignated a suburb on 31 August 1991.

In 1992, the Chung Tian Temple (translation Middle Heaven) was built in traditional Chinese Buddhist architecture. The location was chosen for its natural bushland setting.

The median age of the Priestdale population was 43 years of age, 6 years above the Australian median of 37.  77.3% of people living in Priestdale were born in Australia. The other top responses for country of birth were South Africa 3.9%, England 2.3%, Hong Kong 2.3%, Canada 2.3%, New Zealand 2.3%.  92.8% of people spoke only English at home; the next most common language was 4.8% Mandarin.

Amenities 
The Chung Tian Temple of Fo Guang Shan is 1034 Underwood Road. The temple is for the practice of Humanistic Buddhism (the integration of Buddhism into everyday life) and is committed to multicultural diversity and multi-faith harmony. Events and education sessions are held. There are areas for mediation and study. There is a museum, art gallery and a tea room.

There are a number of parks in the suburb, including:

 Belmore Park
 Don And Christine Burnett Conservation Area

 Longton Court Park

 Underwood Park, 956-1028 Underwood Road 

Underwood Park offers a wide array of sporting facilities, picnic and BBQ areas, and a wedding venue.

References

External links

 Map of Logan city showing Priestdale

Logan City